Guabal is a corregimiento in Boquerón District, Chiriquí Province, Panama. Its population as of 1990 was 602; its population as of 2000 was 649.

References

Corregimientos of Chiriquí Province